The Minister of Education is a minister in the government of New Zealand with responsibility for the country's schools, and is in charge of the Ministry of Education.

The present Minister is Jan Tinetti, a member of the Labour Party.

History
The first minister was appointed in 1878, shortly after the abolition of the Provinces allowed the central government to assume responsibility for education. It has existed without major interruption since then. The size of the portfolio has meant that, particularly since the Fourth Labour Government, additional associate ministers of education, and at times one or more ministers responsible for tertiary education, have been established.

List of Education Ministers
Key

References

External links

New Zealand Ministry of Education

 
1878 establishments in New Zealand
Education
Education in New Zealand